The New York State Assembly is the lower house of the New York State Legislature, with the New York State Senate being the upper house. There are 150 seats in the Assembly. Assembly members serve two-year terms without term limits.

The Assembly convenes at the State Capitol in Albany.

Leadership of the Assembly
The Speaker of the Assembly presides over the Assembly. The Speaker is elected by the Majority Conference followed by confirmation of the full Assembly through the passage of an Assembly Resolution. In addition to presiding over the body, the Speaker also has the chief leadership position, and controls the flow of legislation and committee assignments. The minority leader is elected by party caucus. The majority leader of the Assembly is selected by, and serves, the Speaker.

Democrat Carl Heastie of the 83rd Assembly District has served as Speaker of the Assembly since February 2015. Crystal Peoples-Stokes of the 141st Assembly District has served as Assembly Majority Leader since December 2018. Republican Will Barclay of the 120th Assembly District has served as Assembly Minority Leader since January 2020.

Composition by party
The Assembly has been controlled by the Democratic Party since 1975.

Members of the New York State Assembly

+Elected in a special election

Committees

The New York State Assembly has the following committees:
Aging
Agriculture
Alcoholism and Drug Abuse
Banks
Children and Families
Cities
Codes
Consumer Affairs and Protection
Corporations, Authorities and Commissions
Correction
Economic Development, Job Creation, Commerce and Industry
Education
Election Law
Energy
Environmental Conservation
Ethics and Guidance
Governmental Employees
Governmental Operations
Health
Higher Education
Housing
Insurance
Judiciary
Labor
Libraries and Education Technology
Local Governments
Mental Health
Oversight, Analysis and Investigation
Racing and Wagering
Real Property Taxation
Rules
Small Business
Social Services
Tourism, Parks, Arts and Sports Development
Transportation
Veterans' Affairs
Ways and Means

See also
New York State Capitol
New York Legislature
New York State Senate
Political party strength in New York
New York Provincial Congress

Notes

References

External links

Assembly
State lower houses in the United States